Derald Lawrence Nelson (born February 8, 1958 in York, Nebraska) is a former American football linebacker in the National Football League for the San Diego Chargers. He played college football at the University of Nebraska.

Early years
Nelson attended Fairmont Public School where he received All-State honors in football. He also lettered in baseball as a pitcher.

He walked on at the University of Nebraska. He became a starter at the stand-up defensive end position as a sophomore, registering 42 tackles (20 solo), 3 fumble recoveries, one interception and one blocked a punt. The next year, he recorded 58 tackles (34 solo), 2 fumble recoveries and 2 passes defensed.

As a senior, he was the captain of a defense that gave up an average of only 9.1 points per game. He finished with 57 tackles (42 solo), 2 fumble recoveries and one pass defensed.

In 1998, he was inducted into the Nebraska Football Hall of Fame.

Professional career

Dallas Cowboys
Nelson was selected by the Dallas Cowboys in the fourth round (108th overall) of the 1981 NFL Draft, with the intention of playing him at linebacker. He was waived on August 3.

Cleveland Browns
On August 21, 1981, he signed with the Cleveland Browns as a free agent. He was released before the start of the season.

San Diego Chargers
In 1982, he signed as a free agent with the San Diego Chargers, but suffered an injury during preseason and was placed on the injured reserve list on August 30. The next year, he became a special teams standout. He was voted Chargers special teams player of the year by his teammates in 1983 and 1985.

On August 20, 1984, he was placed on the injured reserve list. He was activated on November 9 and was able to play in six games. Nelson was released on August 29, 1987.

Personal life
His uncle Bob Cerv was a Major League Baseball All-Star with the Kansas City Athletics and the New York Yankees.

References

External links
Nebraska bio

1958 births
Living people
People from York, Nebraska
Players of American football from Nebraska
American football linebackers
Nebraska Cornhuskers football players
San Diego Chargers players